Borat Margaret Sagdiyev is a satirical fictional character created and performed by Sacha Baron Cohen. He is supposedly a Kazakh television journalist and is the main protagonist of the mockumentary Borat! Cultural Learnings of America for Make Benefit Glorious Nation of Kazakhstan (2006), its sequel Borat Subsequent Moviefilm: Delivery of Prodigious Bribe to American Regime for Make Benefit Once Glorious Nation of Kazakhstan (2020), and a main character of Da Ali G Show.

Borat's humour arises from his espousal of outrageous sociocultural viewpoints, his violation of social taboos, and his use of vulgar language and behaviour in inappropriate settings. Most often the comedy relies on Borat's obliviousness to First World natives not sharing his regressive worldview, but occasionally Borat's innocent and collegial demeanor will provoke his targets to reveal biases they would otherwise be reluctant to share publicly. Entertainment Weekly put the 2006 film on its end-of-the-decade, "best-of" list, saying, "The Kazakhstani journalist gave us some of the most incisive cultural commentary ever filmed. That, and a wrestling match between butt-naked men. Something for everyone."

Origins
The character was first developed for the purpose of short skits on F2F on Granada Talk TV that Baron Cohen presented in 1996–1997, with the character at this time being known as Alexi Krickler. The character, now known as Kristo Shqiptari, was picked by BBC Two's Comedy Nation. Alexi and Kristo were nearly identical in looks and demeanor to the later incarnation, although Alexi claimed to be Moldovan and Kristo claimed to be Albanian rather than coming from Kazakhstan. The character remained dormant while Baron Cohen concentrated on his popular Ali G persona for Channel 4's The 11 O'Clock Show, but with the subsequent success of Ali G and the creation of Da Ali G Show (also on Channel 4) Baron Cohen revisited his Borat character.

Fictional character biography

Borat was born and raised in the village of Kuzcek, Kazakh SSR to Maryam Tulyakbay and Boltok the Rapist (who is also stated to be his grandfather, uncle and former father-in-law until the demise of Oksana). He stated that his mother gave birth to him when she was 9 years old. She is shown as a short old lady (revealed to be 43 years old) in his 2006 film, where he gives the viewer a guided tour of his hometown. He has a (remarkably well-endowed) 13-year-old son named Hueylewis, 12-year-old twin boys named Bilak and Biram, as well as 17 grandchildren. He has a sister, Natalya, whom at different times he has described as the "number four prostitute in all of Kazakhstan". Another sister who appears to be a very young teenage girl is shown at the beginning of Borat's Guide to Britain. It has been revealed in an interview with a general practitioner that he caught syphilis from one of his sisters during a Kazakh folk festival. He also has a younger brother, Bilo, who is intellectually disabled and kept locked in a cage. Bilo was not always disabled and was shown as an average early teenage boy in Borat's Guide to Britain. At some point, Bilo sustained brain damage during an exorcism, when another brother of Borat's tried to release a demon from Bilo through the "traditional Kazakh folk remedy" of opening the skull and sticking the tooth of a red-haired woman in the brain.

Borat's neighbours are Nursultan Tuyakbay (whom Borat considers "a pain in my assholes") and Dr. Yamak, a scientist who works for the Kazakh government and claims to have proven that women have "brain the size of squirrel". In Borat's Guide to Britain, Borat and Yamak settle a dispute in the traditional Kazakh "civilised way" by beating each other's genitals with a leather glove until one of them gives up.

It is unknown how many times Borat has been married, but he has had at least five wives. In Borat's Guide to Britain, he admits to being a bigamist and has three additional lovers (two of whom he describes as his "mistress" and his "girlfriend" respectively, while he "has to pay money for" the third). One of his wives (Ludmilla) is said to have been shot by a hunter when he mistook her for a bear as she ploughed the fields. His former wife, Oksana (who was also his half-sister as they had the same biological father), is reported in the Borat film to have been attacked, "violated" and "broken" by a bear while taking his brother Bilo for a walk in the forest. Borat is not saddened at all by the tragedy. He thanks the man who brings him this "good news" by giving him a high five and celebrates his new-found freedom by pursuing Baywatch star Pamela Anderson and eventually reunites with and marries Luenell, an African-American prostitute he met whilst filming his documentary. In the sequel, Luenell is nowhere to be seen and can be assumed to have either left Borat or died in the fourteen years since the first film. Borat goes on to ask a professional babysitter late in the film to be his "new black wife", to which she politely declines.

According to various in-character interviews with Sacha Baron Cohen, Borat attended Astana University, where he studied English, journalism and plague research. He created five new plagues which "killed over five million goats" in Uzbekistan, the country that he has a strong hatred of. Prior to his plague research, Borat worked as an ice maker, "gypsy-catcher", "animal-puller" (one who produces semen from animals) and computer maintenance engineer (specifically removing dead birds which had nested in the vents of computers' casings). He now works as a journalist and announcer on Kazakh television. This job helps Borat and other Kazakhs "express themselves in ways they otherwise would not have been able to do".

Borat mostly speaks English during his reports. His supposed Kazakh language in some scenes is in fact a mix of Hebrew and Polish (both of which Baron Cohen has good knowledge of). Borat usually introduces himself with the term "Jagshemash" ("Jak się masz?", meaning "How are you?" in Polish) and ends reports with "Chenquieh" ("Dziękuję", meaning "Thank you" in Polish). He often uses the phrase "Wa wa wee wa!", an expression of surprised delight which came from a skit by Dov Glickman on the popular Israeli comedy show Zehu Ze!.

Although nominally pagan most of his life in a predominantly Muslim (albeit secular) country, sometimes remarking that he "follow[s] the hawk", during his trip to the USA, he attends a Pentecostal church service and later converts his entire village to Christianity, his version of which involves crucifying Jews. Borat is a keen admirer of Joseph Stalin and claims that both he and Stalin are strong men with powerful "khram" (genitals). He strongly opposes women's rights and is quite aghast upon learning that in Britain and the USA, women can vote while horses cannot. He frequently comments that allowing women to vote is like "allowing a monkey to drive a car". In his spare time, he enjoys playing table tennis (ping pong), sun-bathing while clad in a lime-green mankini, disco dancing, spitting, sitting on comfortable chairs, shooting dogs and taking pictures of women when they "make a toilet". He also enjoys hunting Jews in his homeland. He is extremely fond of "sexy time", particularly "mouth-party" and "hand-party". Borat also states that he "very much like Korki Butchek" (a fictional Kazakh musician).

Ali G
In each episode of Da Ali G Show, Borat is shown doing satirical interviews with often unwitting subjects in the United Kingdom and the United States. The segments were shot in a low-quality video style to maintain the impression of low-quality television broadcasts in a poor country (similar to the Chanel 9 segments on The Fast Show). In Ali G Indahouse, the British Prime Minister and Ali G greet Borat who proceeds to hug and then kiss Ali G, who pushes him away in disgust.

The Borat segments on Da Ali G Show use a rock rendition of a Russian folk tune, "Korobeiniki", as the theme song.

Guide to Britain
This was created as part of a six-part series of Da Ali G Show that was originally broadcast on Channel 4 (UK) starting in March 2000.

Five Borat sketches were shown, in the form of "Guides" to "Etiquette", Hunting, Cambridge, Edinburgh, and Henley. The "Guides" to "English Gentlemen", "Politics" and "Sport" were also filmed at this time but released at a later date as part of Ali G DVDs. The Cambridge sketch is the only major Borat material from this series not to have made it onto the compilation DVDs.

Guide to USA 1
Shown as part of a six-part Ali G Show originally on HBO (US) in February 2003. This series was screened and released in the UK as Ali G in the USAiii.

Six Borat sketches were shown in the form of "Guides" to "Dating",
"Etiquette", "Acting", "Men", "Baseballs" and "The (Deep) South". A "Guide to Animals" was filmed but released at a later date as part of an Ali G DVD.

Guide to USA 2
Shown as part of a six-part Ali G Show originally on HBO (US) in July 2004. (Channel 4 was the UK channel where Ali G and Borat originally appeared, and the series for America was a joint HBO/Channel 4 co-production). This series was re-edited for the UK to remove all the Ali G material, becoming two prime-time Borat's Television Programme specials for Channel 4. These specials also embodied the Brüno segments from the series and Borat's "Guide To Hunting", not screened in the US version. The uncut second series as it appeared on HBO was later given a UK courtesy transmission on digital channel E4.

Six Borat sketches were shown in the form of "Guides" to "Wine Tasting", "Politics", "Country Music", "Hobbies", "Buying a House" and "Jobs" (careers), with "Hunting" airing in the UK only.

Films

Ali G Indahouse
Borat had a small cameo role in Baron Cohen's film Ali G Indahouse as a Kazakhstani diplomat.

Borat

Subtitled Cultural Learnings of America for Make Benefit Glorious Nation of Kazakhstan, the film Borat is a mockumentary comedy. Most of those appearing in the film are not paid performers, but real people whom Borat met on his journey. The film was distributed by 20th Century Fox, and directed by Larry Charles. It premiered at the 2006 Toronto International Film Festival, and was released across Europe on 2 November 2006 and North America on 3 November 2006.

The film follows Borat in his travels across the United States, as he commits cultural solecisms and exposes a few American ones. Over the course of the film, Borat falls in love with Pamela Anderson after watching a rerun of Baywatch, and vows to make her his wife.

The film opened at No. 1 in the U.S., taking in $26.4 million on a limited release of 837 screens during its first weekend, beating Fahrenheit 9/11 as the biggest opening weekend for a film released in fewer than 1,000 cinemas. Baron Cohen celebrated the release of the film with a host of promotional in-character interviews. The film expanded its release on the second weekend to 2,566 screens, where it took in an additional $29 million.

In 2007, Baron Cohen won a Golden Globe for "Best Performance by an Actor in a Motion Picture – Musical Or Comedy". With a production budget of $18,000,000 the film has grossed $128,501,044 in the United States of America and another $128,848,505 internationally, for a worldwide gross of $257,349,549 by mid-March 2007.

Borat Subsequent Moviefilm

In 2020, Baron Cohen filmed several pranks for a sequel film, a mockumentary comedy just like the first film.

Since the end of the previous film, Borat was sentenced to a work camp. The film follows Borat as he is ordered to marry his daughter to Mike Pence, and later Rudy Giuliani. Borat then goes back to Kazakhstan in defeat, however, realizes that the Kazakh government has deliberately infected the world with coronavirus and is paid to keep the secret and is forgiven.

Book
In 2007, Baron Cohen released a book titled Touristic Guidings to Glorious Nation of Kazakhstan/Touristic Guidings to Minor Nation of U.S. and A., with humour about both countries in a similar vein to the movie.

Family

|-
|style="text-align: left;"|Notes:

In 2007, Sacha Baron Cohen stated that the character of Borat, alongside his Ali G character, would be retired. Borat's last appearances were at Night of Too Many Stars: An Overbooked Event for Autism Education 2006 television special and an online public service announcement  ahead of the 2008 United States elections. However, in 2016, to promote the trailer release of his film Grimsby, Baron Cohen appeared in character as Borat on Jimmy Kimmel Live! He then made an appearance on the show on 7 November 2018 as a part of a guest appearance by Baron Cohen to promote his show Who Is America? In 2020, Baron Cohen officially rekindled Borat with the filming of Borat Subsequent Moviefilm, which was released on 23 October 2020, introducing the character of Borat's daughter Tutar Sagdiyev, portrayed by Maria Bakalova.

In other films
Borat himself was parodied in the critically panned 2007 parody film Epic Movie and was played by Danny Jacobs.

In pop cultures and references
In the Youtube channel video entitled Why People Believe Jesus Had a Wife, it mentioned if Jesus had a wife if it was said by Borat.

Criticism and controversy

Criticized as unfair smear against Kazakhstan
There have been arguments that the film's portrayal of the people of Kazakhstan is unfair and unjustified.

On 19 October 2006, the BBC reported that Kazakhstan's Deputy Foreign Minister, Rakhat Aliyev, had invited Baron Cohen to visit Kazakhstan to see how inaccurate his portrayals were. In an interview, Aliyev asserted that "His trip could yield a lot of discoveries—that women not only travel inside buses but also drive their own cars, that we make wine from grapes, that Jews can freely attend synagogues and so on."

Denigration of Roma
Borat's movie has been accused of promoting antiziganism. The film has been criticised for several scenes portraying Borat's fictional "Kazakh" village which were actually filmed in the impoverished Roma village of Glod in Romania. USA Today reports that poverty-stricken villagers were offered between $3.30 and $5.50 to bring animals into their houses and other gag scenes for the movie that some people described as humiliating. The studio contends that participants were paid double the rate recommended by the Romanian film office for extras.  Additionally, Baron Cohen personally donated $5,000 to the village, as well as computers and school supplies.

Two villagers of Glod hired controversial reparation attorney Ed Fagan to sue the makers of the film for $30 million for human rights abuses. Fagan intended to submit lawsuits in New York and Florida state courts, as well as in Frankfurt, Germany. Fagan said that he hoped to "teach Hollywood a very expensive lesson." The lawsuit was thrown out by U.S. District Judge Loretta Preska in a hearing in early December 2006 on the ground that the charges were too vague to stand up in court. Fagan planned to refile, but has since been disbarred.

Denigration of Jews
The Borat character has been accused of anti-Semitism but Baron Cohen, himself a Jew, has explained that the segments are a "dramatic demonstration of how racism feeds on dumb conformity, as much as rabid bigotry." "Borat essentially works as a tool. By himself pretending to be anti-Semitic, he lets people lower their guard and expose their own prejudice," Baron Cohen explained to Rolling Stone. Baron Cohen, the grandson of a Holocaust survivor, says he wishes in particular to expose the role of indifference:

(The exact line from Kershaw's 1983 book Popular Opinion and Political Dissent in the Third Reich was that "the road to Auschwitz was built by hate, but paved with indifference".)

However, the Anti-Defamation League, a United States-based group that "...combat[s] anti-Semitism and bigotry of all kinds", complained to HBO after Borat performed his country and western song "In My Country There Is Problem". It called on people to "throw the Jew down the well", warning that "you must be careful of his teeth" and that "you must grab him by his money", and was welcomed with applause and participation by some members of an audience in Tucson, Arizona. The full chorus goes: "Throw the Jew down the well / So my country can be free / You must grab him by his horns / Then we have a big party." Regarding the enthusiastic response to "In My Country There Is Problem", he says, "Did it reveal that they were anti-Semitic? Perhaps. But maybe it just revealed that they were indifferent to anti-Semitism."

In another scene, Borat visits the Serengeti Range ranch in Texas, where the owner of the ranch, Gene Gordon confides that he believes the Holocaust was a necessity for Germany. He further implies that he would have no moral qualms about running a ranch where people can hunt, in Borat's words, "deer...then Jew."

An interview with James Broadwater, an evangelical Christian and Republican candidate for the United States' Congress from Mississippi, caused Broadwater to receive some hate emails after an episode of Da Ali G Show aired in which Broadwater stated that all non-Christians (including Jews) will go to Hell. He was told that the interview would be played in foreign countries to teach others about the American political system. Broadwater later posted a letter on his website denouncing Da Ali G Show, explaining that his statement referred to a theological belief that anyone that "accepts Jesus Christ as Lord and Saviour will spend eternity in Heaven, while everyone who rejects Him will spend eternity in Hell." Broadwater did not apologise for his comments. Instead, he insisted that "the liberal, anti-God media needs to be brought under the strict control of the FCC, and that as soon as possible."

In the film, Borat continues his anti-Semitic stance. When he mentions his decision to avoid flying while in America, Borat says that his colleague "insists we not fly in case the Jews repeat their attack of 9/11". Later, he finds himself in a bed & breakfast run by a kind elderly Jewish couple. He tries to "escape", and throws money at two woodlice that have crawled into his room, apparently believing that the Jewish hosts have shapeshifted into the tiny woodlice. He was amazed that they had managed to look human, and states that one "can hardly see their horns". Borat is completely oblivious to his hosts' religious beliefs or ethnicity when he first meets them, despite how obvious it is: the man wears a kippah and the woman openly displays her paintings of Jewish people all over the house. Borat does not understand until the woman explicitly states to him: "I'm Jewish."

The film has enjoyed particular success in Israel because Israeli filmgoers understand what Borat is really saying when he is supposedly spouting Kazakh: throughout the film, Borat speaks fluent Hebrew with some phrases in Polish, and his assistant speaks Armenian.

Views on the Iraq War
On 7 January 2005, after convincing the authorities that he was shooting a documentary film, Baron Cohen managed to infuriate a crowd at a rodeo in Salem, Virginia. Even though the crowd first cheered at the beginning of his statements of support for the Iraq War:

He then went on to sing an out-of-tune rendition of "The Star-Spangled Banner" with the lyrics replaced by those of the fictitious "Kazakh national anthem" "O Kazakhstan" used at the end of the film (composed by Erran Baron Cohen), beginning with "Kazakhstan, greatest country in the world / All other countries are run by little girls..."

The crowd was not pleased. One witness stated that "if he [Baron Cohen] had been out there a minute longer, I think somebody would have shot him [...] people were booing him, flipping him off." For his own safety, Baron Cohen was escorted from the venue (much of the event appears in the movie). A credible news report about the incident, aired on a local television station, is included in the DVD extras.

References

External links

 boratonline.co.uk Semi-official Borat site since 1999 – contains interviews with Dan Mazer and Sacha Baron Cohen
 

Comedy film characters
20th Century Studios characters
Comedy television characters
Television characters introduced in 1997
Fictional interviewers
Da Ali G Show
Fictional offspring of incestuous relationships
Incest in fiction
Fictional reporters
Fictional television personalities
Fictional Soviet people
Fictional Kazakhstani people
Fictional Muslims
Ethnic humour